Andrea Cipriano Brambilla (21 August 1946 − 24 October 2013), better known as Zuzzurro, was an Italian actor and comedian.

Zuzzurro was born on 21 August 1946 in Varese. He was a former member of Zuzzurro e Gaspare with Nino Formicola (Gaspare).

In September 2013, it was reported Zuzzurro had lung cancer. He subsequently died of the illness on 24 October 2013, aged 67, in Milan.

Filmography

References

External links

1946 births
2013 deaths
Deaths from lung cancer in Lombardy
Italian male film actors
Italian male comedians
Actors from Varese